Singoalla may refer to:

 Singoalla, the original title for the novel with the English title The Wind Is My Lover, by Swedish author Viktor Rydberg
 Singoalla (opera), by Gunnar de Frumerie, 1940, opera based on the novel.
 Singoalla (film), a 1949 film based on the novel
 Singoalla (album), a music album by Joakim Thåström and Hell
 Singoalla, a Swedish brand of shortbread biscuit with raspberry, citrus, licorice or blueberry filling and cream with vanilla flavour.
Singoalla 34, a Swedish sailboat design.